Pedrezuela is a municipality of the Community of Madrid, Spain.

Public transport 
Pedrezuela has three line buses, one local line and two that connect the village with Madrid. These lines are: 

L-1: Pedrezuela - Urbanizations 

191: Madrid - Buitrago

193: Madrid - Pedrezuela - El Vellón

References

External links
 Official Website
 History
 

Municipalities in the Community of Madrid